On 18 June 2021, a building collapse occurred at a school construction site in Antwerp, Belgium. Five construction workers were killed and 20 more wounded.

Event 
The disaster happened on a new development project where a new primary school was being constructed in the suburb of Nieuw Zuid. The construction workers were mostly Portuguese and Romanian, employed legally and living in the Antwerp area. On the afternoon of 18 June, scaffolding and parts of the building collapsed. The cause is unknown. The project was developed by Compagnie-O architects and executed by the construction firm Democo, The victims were all foreign workers, including three Portuguese nationals, one Russian and one Romanian.

The Belga news agency reported that the sub-contractors worked for construction firm Democo.

Response 
The following day, King Philippe of Belgium and Prime Minister Alexander De Croo visited the site and spoke with emergency workers. An investigation is underway.

References

See also 

 Surfside condominium building collapse, which happened in Miami, Florida 6 days later

2021 disasters in Belgium
2021 in Belgium
21st century in Antwerp
Building collapses in 2021
Building collapses in Europe
Disasters in Belgium
June 2021 events in Belgium
Building collapses in Belgium
Construction accidents